The 1919 Maryland State Aggies football team was an American football team that represented Maryland State College (which in 1920 became part of the University of Maryland) in the South Atlantic Intercollegiate Athletic Association (SAIAA) during the 1919 college football season. In their ninth season under head coach Curley Byrd, the Aggies compiled a 5–4 record and outscored their opponents by a total of 93 to 74. In the final game of the season, the Aggies won the Maryland state championship by defeating Johns Hopkins by a 13 to 0 score in Baltimore.

Schedule

References

Maryland State
Maryland Terrapins football seasons
Maryland State Aggies football